Aládar Tóth (4 February 189828 October 1968) was a  Hungarian musicologist and opera manager, regarded as a leading music critic in Hungary between the world wars, writing for Nyugat, among others. He was istrumental in the recognition of composers such as Zoltán Kodály and Béla Bartók. He was general manager of the Hungarian State Opera from 1946 to 1956.

Life and career 
Tóth was born in Székesfehérvár on 4 February 1898. He received instructions in both piano and composition in his home town. He then studied at the University of Budapest, achieving a Ph.D. in 1925 with a dissertation about the aesthetics of Mozart's dramatic musi). He worked as a music critic for the newspapers and journals, Uj nemzedék  from 1920 to 1923, then Pesti napló to 1939. He wrote for Nyugat (West), a progressive journal, from 1923 to 1940. He played a role in the reception of the music by Béla Bartók; in a yearly commentary in Nyugat about the concert season, he regularly emphasised the composer's importance for Hungarian culture, and criticised lack of performances by the major music institutions.

During World War II, the family went to exile first in Sweden and then lived in Switzerland. They returned to Budapest after the war, and Tóth served as director of the Hungarian State Opera from 1946 to 1956. He received the Kossuth Prize in 1952.

Personal life 
Tóth was married in 1937 to the pianist Annie Fischer. He died in Budapest on 28 October 1968.

References

Further reading
  

1898 births
1968 deaths
Hungarian musicologists
Hungarian music critics
Opera managers
Recipients of the Kossuth Prize
Bartók scholars